Middle Mill Historic District is a national historic district located at New York Mills in Oneida County, New York. The district includes 31 contributing structures and one contributing site.  It consists of a grouping of structures clustered in the vicinity of a large mill complex known as Mill Number 2 or the Middle Mills.  In addition to the mill complex, there are two churches, rows of factory workers' housing, and a commercial block.

It was listed on the National Register of Historic Places in 1976.

References

Historic districts on the National Register of Historic Places in New York (state)
Historic districts in Oneida County, New York
National Register of Historic Places in Oneida County, New York